Faverolles (Auvergnat: Favairòlas) is a former commune in the Cantal department in south-central France. On 1 January 2016, it was merged into the new commune Val-d'Arcomie.

Population

See also
Lac de Grandval
Communes of the Cantal department

References

Former communes of Cantal
Populated places disestablished in 2016